Turn It Over is the second album by the American jazz fusion group the Tony Williams Lifetime, released in 1970 via Polydor Records. It was rereleased by Verve Records in 1997, as part of Spectrum: The Anthology. Williams is again joined by guitarist John McLaughlin and organist Larry Young, along with former Cream frontman Jack Bruce.

Production
Jack Bruce joined the group for Turn It Over, providing bass and vocals. Tony Williams was excited by the amplification he could employ during the recording of the album; his liner notes repeatedly instruct the listener to play the album at a high volume. Williams described the album as his version of the MC5's Kick Out the Jams.

The album contains a cover of John Coltrane's "Big Nick".

Critical reception
AllMusic called the album "one of the more intense pieces of early jazz-rock fusion around," writing that "in parts, it's like Jimi Hendrix's Band of Gypsys with much better chops." JazzTimes praised Larry Young's "fearsome long tones and wobbly distortions" and "psychedelic, dissonant harmonies." Vibe deemed Turn It Over "one of the most violent, raucous recordings ever to issue from a noted jazz musician." The Guardian called it "tougher" than the debut, singling out the cover of "Big Nick".

Track listing

Personnel
Tony Williams - drums, vocals on "This Night This Song", "Once I Loved", "A Famous Blues"
John McLaughlin - guitar, vocals on "A Famous Blues"
Larry Young - organ
Jack Bruce - bass, lead vocals on "One Word"

References

The Tony Williams Lifetime albums
1970 albums